Siwat Chotchaicharin, better known by his nickname Jayden Cee (ซี), is a Thai actor, singer and TV host.  He attended Assumption University (Thailand), earning a Bachelor of Business Administration. He also played Fon Luang, a leading role in the musical Klaikangwol: Musical On The Beach, the first Thai beach musical, which was held at Hua Hin from 20 to 24 February 2013.

Filmography
Ghost of Mae Nak (2005)

Drama
Duttawan Dangphupha (ดุจตะวัน ดั่งภูผา) (2012)
Kunnachaai Liang Moo... Kunnanoo Liang Gae (คุณชายเลี้ยงหมู...คุณหนูเลี้ยงแกะ) (2013)
Kon La Lok (คนละโลก) (2015)

Notes

References

Master of Ceremony: MC ON TV
Present 

Former

External links

Living people
1982 births
Siwat Chotchaicharin
Siwat Chotchaicharin
Siwat Chotchaicharin
Siwat Chotchaicharin
Siwat Chotchaicharin
Siwat Chotchaicharin
Siwat Chotchaicharin
Siwat Chotchaicharin